Saint-Alban  is a French place-name that may refer to:

France

Ain
Saint-Alban, Ain, France

Ardèche
Saint-Alban-Auriolles, Ardèche
Saint-Alban-d'Ay, Ardèche
Saint-Alban-en-Montagne, Ardèche
Saint-Alban-sous-Sampzon, former commune of Ardèche

Côtes-d'Armor
Saint-Alban, Côtes-d'Armor, France

Haute-Garonne
Saint-Alban, Haute-Garonne, France

Isère
Saint-Alban-de-Roche, Isère 
Saint-Alban-du-Rhône, Isère

Loire
Saint-Alban-les-Eaux, Loire

Lozère
Saint-Alban-sur-Limagnole, Lozère

Savoie
Saint-Alban-de-Montbel, Savoie 
Saint-Alban-des-Hurtières, Savoie 
Saint-Alban-des-Villards, Savoie 
Saint-Alban-Leysse, Savoie

Canada
Saint-Alban, Quebec, Canada

See also
Alban (disambiguation)
St. Albans (disambiguation)